The smokey chromis (Chromis fumea), also known as the smokey puller or the yellow demoiselle, is a damselfish of the genus Chromis, found in the tropical waters of the eastern Indian Ocean, and the western Pacific Ocean across to north New Zealand, at depths of between 3 and 25 metres, off rocky or coral reef areas.  Its length is between 5 and 10 cm.

References

 Tony Ayling & Geoffrey Cox, Collins Guide to the Sea Fishes of New Zealand,  (William Collins Publishers Ltd, Auckland, New Zealand 1982)

External links
 Fishes of Australia : Chromis fumea

smokey chromis
Marine fish of Northern Australia
smokey chromis